Thelma Harrington Bell (July 3, 1896 – May 1985) and Corydon Whitten Bell (July 16, 1894 – June 1980) were American authors from the state of North Carolina. As a husband and wife team, they wrote and illustrated a number of children's books, many set in North Carolina. In 1961 Thelma Bell received the Dorothy Canfield Fisher Children's Book Award for Captain Ghost, and several of the Bells' books have been Junior Literary Guild selections. Corydon Bell also did illustrations for magazines and books by other writers.

As well as children's novels, they produced some children's science books on weather and time.

Selected books
 Yaller-Eye, 1951
 Take It Easy, 1953
 Snow, 1954 (non-fiction)
 Captain Ghost, 1959
 Thunderstorm, 1960 (non-fiction)
 The Two Worlds of Davy Blount, 1962
 The Riddle of Time, 1963 (non-fiction)
 A Dash of Pepper, 1965

External links
 Thelma and Corydon Bell Papers at UNC–Greensboro, with biographical note
 Corydon Bell Papers in the de Grummond Collection at Southern Miss, with biographical sketch
  
 
 Corydon Bell at LC Authorities, with 15 records
 
 

American children's writers
Married couples
People from North Carolina
Children's non-fiction writers